Senator Royce may refer to:

Ed Royce (born 1951), California State Senate
George E. Royce (1829–1903), Vermont State Senate